The Braghiș Alliance was a six-party centre-left political alliance in Moldova.

History
The Alliance was formed by Prime Minister Dumitru Braghiș to contest the 2001 parliamentary elections. It consisted of six small centre-left parties; the Movement of Professionals "Hope", the New Force Movement, the Social Democracy Party "Ant", the Socialist Party of Moldova, the Centrist Union of Moldova, and the Labour Party.

The Alliance won 19 seats in the elections, emerging as the second-largest faction in Parliament behind the Party of Communists of the Republic of Moldova, which won 71 seats. In 2003 the Social Democracy Party "Ant" (by then renamed the Social Democratic Alliance) joined the Our Moldova Alliance.

References

Defunct political party alliances in Moldova